Sardus, also Sid Addir and Sardus Pater ("Sardinian Father") was the eponymous mythological hero of the Nuragic Sardinians. Sardus appears in the writings of various classical authors, like Sallust, Solinus and Pausanias.

Ancient sources
According to Sallust, Sardus son of Hercules, left Libya along with a great multitude of men and occupied the island of Sardinia, which was so named after him. Later Pausanias confirms the story of Sallust and in the second century CE writes that Sardus was the son of Makeris (identifiable with Mecur / Macer, a Libyan name deriving from the Berber imɣur "to grow"), and that the island of Sardinia changed its name from Ichnusa to Sardinia in honor of Sardus.

See also
Temple of Antas
Sherden
Norax
Iolaus

Notes

External links

Heroes in mythology and legend
Ancient Sardinia